East Pangia Rural LLG is a local-level government (LLG) of Southern Highlands Province, Papua New Guinea.

Wards
01. Molo
02. Alia
03. Morea 1
04. Morea 2
05. Pokale 1
06. Pokale 2
07. Apenda 1
08. Apenda 2
09. Mele 1
10. Mele 2
11. Kumiane
12. Pondi
13. Pangia Station
14. Maia
15. Kauwo 1
16. Kauwo 2
17. Kauwo 3
18. Leka/Koiya
19. Yunguli
20. Tindua 1
21. Tindua 2
22. Walapape
23. Walapape
24. Walupo
25. Walupoi
26. Mondanda

References

Local-level governments of Southern Highlands Province